The 1949 Dixie Classic was a mid-season college basketball tournament held December 28–30, 1949 at NC State's Reynolds Coliseum in Raleigh, North Carolina. It was the first iteration of the Dixie Classic and it was part of the 1949–50 NCAA men's basketball season.

The championship game was contested by favorite NC State, who cruised to the final with double-digit wins over Rhode Island State and Georgia Tech, and underdog Penn State, who advanced with narrow upset wins over Duke and West Virginia. After initially struggling against Penn State's zone defense, NC State rallied back from a halftime deficit and won by a score of 50–40. Dick Dickey of NC State was voted most valuable player of the tournament.

Teams
Each year, the Dixie Classic included the "Big Four" teams (Duke, NC State, North Carolina, and Wake Forest), as well as four other invited teams. The 1949 teams were:
 Wake Forest Demon Deacons
 Georgia Tech Yellow Jackets
 NC State Wolfpack
 Rhode Island State Rams
 North Carolina Tar Heels
 West Virginia Mountaineers
 Duke Blue Devils
 Penn State Nittany Lions

The first round pairings were decided by drawing names from a hat on September 5, 1949.

Bracket

Game log

References

1949–50 NCAA men's basketball season
1949 in sports in North Carolina
December 1949 sports events in the United States
1949